"Aces High" is a song by English heavy metal band Iron Maiden, written by the band's bassist Steve Harris. It is Iron Maiden's eleventh single release and the second from their fifth studio album, Powerslave (1984).

The first B-side is a cover of Nektar's "King of Twilight", from their 1972 album A Tab in the Ocean. Their cover is actually a medley of the songs "Crying in the Dark" and "King of Twilight", the last two songs on the album. The Japanese 12" was mixed with the B-side covers from "The Trooper" and "2 Minutes to Midnight" singles.

Song information
The song's lyrics are written from the viewpoint of a British RAF pilot fighting during the Battle of Britain (1940), the first military engagement to be fought entirely with aircraft. The artwork depicts the band's mascot, Eddie the Head, in the cockpit of a Supermarine Spitfire, one of the principal aircraft to participate in that battle.

"Aces High" is one of Iron Maiden's most popular songs, and has been covered numerous times. It is featured in the video game Madden NFL 10, the MTV show Nitro Circus, and Steve Peat's segment in the mountain bike film New World Disorder III. Colin McKay used the song on his part of the skate video Plan B Questionable.  It can also be found in the soundtrack of the game Carmageddon II: Carpocalypse Now.

Live performances
"Aces High" is frequently used as the opening song for Iron Maiden concerts. As seen in concert videos such as Live After Death and Iron Maiden: Flight 666, it is usually preceded by Winston Churchill's "We shall fight on the beaches" speech with the sound of planes in the background. Churchill's speech was also included at the beginning of the song's music video.

In a 2014 interview with Q magazine, Gerard Way said that "the live version of 'Aces High' off the Live After Death album was the song that first made [him] interested in performing live."

"Aces High" has been performed on five Iron Maiden Tours (World Slavery Tour, The Ed Hunter Tour, Somewhere Back in Time World Tour, Maiden England World Tour and Legacy of the Beast World Tour). It was the opener to all five tours in which it was performed except for the Maiden England World Tour where it was moved to the encore.

Track listing
7" single

12" single

Japanese and Brazilian 12" maxi single

Personnel
Production credits are adapted from the 7-inch vinyl, and 12-inch vinyl covers.>
Iron Maiden
 Bruce Dickinson - vocals
 Dave Murray - guitar
 Adrian Smith - guitar
 Steve Harris - bass guitar
 Nicko McBrain - drums
Production
Martin Birch – producer, engineer
Derek Riggs – cover illustration

Appearances

 A version recorded in the summer of 1996 by Arch Enemy was – as guitarist Michael Amott observed in the liner notes to Wages of Sin (on which the cut reappears) – "released on the Japanese Iron Maiden tribute album Made in Tribute. This one turned out really intense, and was easily one of the better songs on a really terrible collection of Iron Maiden cover versions."
 It was covered in 2005 by Jeff Scott Soto (Yngwie Malmsteen), Nuno Bettencourt (Extreme), Billy Sheehan (Mr. Big, Niacin), and Vinny Appice (Black Sabbath, Dio) – drums on the tribute album Numbers from the Beast.
 It was covered in 2006 by Concord Dawn (featuring State of Mind) on the album Chaos by Design.
 It was covered in 2006 by The Iron Maidens on the album The Iron Maidens
 It was covered in 2008 by Children of Bodom on the album Skeletons in the Closet.
It was covered in 2011 by Reinxeed on the album 1912.
It was covered in 2020 by Japanese metal band Nemophila.

Chart performance

See also
 List of anti-war songs

Notes

References

External links
 Aces High - original video on Youtube

Iron Maiden songs
1984 singles
Songs about the military
Songs about World War II
Songs written by Steve Harris (musician)
1984 songs
EMI Records singles
Capitol Records singles